Northern is one of the 18 wilayat or states of Sudan. It has an area of 348,765 km² and an estimated population of  833,743 (2006). Northern Sudan was in ancient times Nubia. Jebel Uweinat is a mountain range in the area of the Egyptian-Libyan-Sudanese border.

Localities
Dongola (Capital)
Gararish
Merowe
Wadi Halfa
Al Dabbah
Delgo
Al Goled
Al Burgaig

References

States of Sudan